Dinosaur Park is a tourist attraction in Rapid City, South Dakota, United States. Dedicated on May 22, 1936, it contains seven dinosaur sculptures on a hill overlooking the city, created to capitalize on the tourists coming to the Black Hills to see Mount Rushmore. Constructed by the city of Rapid City and the Works Progress Administration, WPA Project #960's dinosaurs were designed by Emmet Sullivan. Sullivan also designed the Apatosaurus (formerly thought of as a synonym of Brontosaurus) at Wall Drug nearby in Wall, South Dakota, the Christ of the Ozarks statue in Eureka Springs, Arkansas, and the dinosaurs at the now closed Dinosaur World in Beaver, Arkansas.

The park is located at 940 Skyline Drive and is maintained by the city of Rapid City.  Admission is free, however steep flagstone stairs may limit handicapped accessibility.  The park was listed on the National Register of Historic Places on June 21, 1990.

Dinosaurs on display
Dinosaurs represented in the park include Apatosaurus, Tyrannosaurus rex, Triceratops, Stegosaurus, and an Edmontosaurus annectens (formerly Anatotitan which itself was formerly Trachodon).  A Protoceratops and a Dimetrodon (Dimetrodon is not actually a dinosaur, but rather a synapsid, and more closely related to mammals than reptiles) were added later on and are located near the gift shop and parking lot.  With the exception of the Protoceratops, the dinosaurs they selected were based on fossils found in South Dakota and the Western United States.

The dinosaurs were constructed out of 2 inch (5.08 centimeters) black iron pipe, with a wire mesh frame and a concrete skin.  Originally they were gray in color, but by the 1950s the statues were painted bright green with white undersides.  Being constructed in the 1930s, the dinosaurs reflect the thinking of the times (for example, dragging tails).  The tyrannosaur's original finger claws (of which it incorrectly had three on each hand) as well as its teeth have been lost or damaged over the years to where its hands are stumps and its teeth are all but gone.  Vintage postcards of the T. rex do in fact show these were originally part of the sculpture.  The Stegosaurus also had a shorter tail with 4 correct tail spikes, but this has changed recently where the tail spikes have been removed (perhaps due to safety concerns) and the tail considerably lengthened.

Gallery of Dinosaur Park images

See also 

 List of dinosaur parks
 Dinosaur Gardens Prehistorical Zoo - Dinosaur tourist attraction built in the 1930s in Ossineke, Michigan
 Wall Drug - The Wall Drug Dinosaur was also sculpted by Emmet Sullivan

References

External links

  “Roadside Attractions”, a National Park Service Teaching with Historic Places (TwHP) lesson plan
 Official site
 Roadside America
 MinnesotaJones.com - Extensive Photograph/Postcard Record of Dinosaur Park
 

Roadside attractions in South Dakota
Dinosaur sculptures
Buildings and structures in Rapid City, South Dakota
Parks on the National Register of Historic Places in South Dakota
Outdoor sculptures in South Dakota
Black Hills
Works Progress Administration in South Dakota
Tourist attractions in Rapid City, South Dakota
Concrete sculptures in the United States
National Register of Historic Places in Pennington County, South Dakota
1936 establishments in South Dakota